Aurora Productions was a film production company established in Hollywood, California in 1978 by former executives of The Walt Disney Company Rich Irvine and James L. Stewart.  It became defunct in 1990.

Films

References 

1978 establishments in California
1990 disestablishments in California
Companies based in Los Angeles
Defunct American film studios
Entertainment companies based in California
Film production companies of the United States
Mass media companies established in 1978
Mass media companies disestablished in 1990